The  is a public junior college in Matsue, Shimane, Japan.

History 
It was established in 1953 as a junior college for women. In 2007, the junior college became coeducational.

See also 
 List of junior colleges in Japan
 University of Shimane

External links
  

Japanese junior colleges
Universities and colleges in Shimane Prefecture
Public universities in Japan
Educational institutions established in 1953
1953 establishments in Japan